Antonio Jean-Paul Gladu (June 20, 1921 — February 1, 2015) was a Canadian professional ice hockey player who played 40 games in the National Hockey League. Born in St-Hyacinthe, Quebec, he played with the Boston Bruins. He died in 2015, aged 93.

Career statistics

Regular season and playoffs

References

External links
 

1921 births
2015 deaths
Boston Bruins players
Canadian ice hockey left wingers
Cleveland Barons (1937–1973) players
Hershey Bears players
Ice hockey people from Quebec
Providence Reds players
St. Louis Flyers players
Sportspeople from Saint-Hyacinthe